Mike London is a former professional American football linebacker.

Biography
London was born Michael David London on December 31, 1944 in Madison, Wisconsin.

Career
London was drafted in the fourteenth round of the 1966 American Football League Draft by the San Diego Chargers and played that season with the team. He played at the collegiate level at the University of Wisconsin–Madison.

References

Sportspeople from Madison, Wisconsin
Players of American football from Wisconsin
San Diego Chargers players
American football linebackers
Wisconsin Badgers football players
1944 births
Living people
American Football League players